The Sauvie Island UFO refers to the remains of an experimental concrete sailing boat designed by Richard Ensign during the 1970s. The boat ran aground and was abandoned on Sauvie Island, in the U.S. state of Oregon, and is now covered in graffiti.

References

External links

 

1970s works
Boats
Sauvie Island